Gavriilidis is a Greek surname, derived from the given name Gabriel. Notable people with the surname include:

Giorgos Gavriilidis (1908–1982), Greek actor
Ioannis Gavriilidis (born 1982), Greek Olympic diver
Vlasis Gavriilidis (1848–1920), Greek journalist

Greek-language surnames
Surnames
Patronymic surnames
Surnames from given names